Smith's Ballpark (formerly known as Franklin Quest Field, later Franklin Covey Field, and more recently Spring Mobile Ballpark) is a minor league baseball park in Salt Lake City, Utah. It is the home field of the Salt Lake Bees of the Pacific Coast League and the collegiate Utah Utes of the Pac-12 Conference.

History
Smith's Ballpark opened  in 1994 with a seating capacity of 15,400, the largest in the PCL. It is located on the site of its predecessor, Derks Field, with a similar unorthodox southeast alignment, toward the Wasatch Range.

In its inaugural season in 1994, the Buzz set a PCL attendance record with 713,224 fans.  The team led the PCL in attendance in each of its first six seasons in Salt Lake.  The largest crowd at the ballpark is 16,531 in 2000; the Saturday night opponent was the Albuquerque Dukes on July 22.

Besides hosting the Salt Lake Bees, Smith's Ballpark has played host to two exhibition games featuring the Minnesota Twins, a spring training game featuring the Seattle Mariners and the Colorado Rockies, concerts, soccer matches, and high school and college baseball games, including a Mountain West Conference tournament.

The ballpark has hosted the Triple-A All-Star Game twice. In 1996, a team of National League-affiliated All-Stars defeated their American League opponents, 2–1. Salt Lake's Todd Walker was selected as the PCL MVP. The game returned to the park in 2011 with the International League All-Stars beating the PCL team, 3–0.

After Franklin Covey's 15-year naming rights agreements expired in 2009, an agreement with Spring Mobile, an AT&T Mobility authorized retailer, made the ballpark's name Spring Mobile Ballpark for five seasons.

Leading up to and during the Salt Lake Winter Olympic Games in 2002, the ballpark served as a ticketing and service center.

In January 2023, the Larry H. Miller Co., owner of the Salt Lake Bees, announced that they would be building a privately-financed stadium in the Daybreak section of suburban South Jordan, Utah, with a planned opening in the spring of 2025, ending a 31-year run at Smith's Ballpark.

Features
Smith's Ballpark is noted for its views of the Wasatch Mountains over the left and center field walls.

The stadium is located one block east of Ballpark station on the TRAX light rail system.

Naming rights

When the ballpark opened in 1994, it was called Franklin Quest Field, for which the Franklin Quest Company paid $1.4 million in the summer of 1993 for 15 years of naming rights. It changed its name to Franklin Covey Field in 1997 after Franklin Quest merged with the Covey Leadership Center, becoming Franklin Covey.

In 2009, the Bees announced on April 7 that they had reached a multi-year naming-rights deal with Spring Mobile (a Salt Lake City-based AT&T authorized retailer) to provide the ballpark's new name of Spring Mobile Ballpark which ran for five seasons. 

In March 2014, it was announced that Salt Lake City-based Smith's Food and Drug had signed a six-year naming rights deal, giving the park its current name.

See also
 List of NCAA Division I baseball venues
 List of Pacific Coast League stadiums

References

External links

 Smith's Ballpark

College baseball venues in the United States
Utah Utes baseball
Minor league baseball venues
Sports venues in Salt Lake City
Baseball venues in Utah
Sports venues completed in 1994
1994 establishments in Utah
Populous (company) buildings
Pacific Coast League ballparks